Hemidactylus bavazzanoi, also known commonly as Bavazzano's gecko, the Somali banded gecko, and  the Somali leaf-toed gecko,  is a species of lizard in the family Gekkonidae. The species is native to eastern Africa.

Etymology
The specific name, bavazzanoi, is in honor of Italian botanist Renato Bavazzano.

Geographic range
H. bavazzanoi is found in southern Ethiopia, northeastern Kenya, and southern Somalia.

Habitat
The preferred natural habitat of H. bavazzanoi is shrubland.

Description
Dorsally, it is pink with four black crossbands, a crescentic one on the neck, two on the body, and one on the base of the tail.

Reproduction
H. bavazzanoi is oviparous.

References

Further reading
Lanza B (1978). "On some new or interesting east African reptiles and amphibians". Monitore Zoologico Italiano, Supplemento 10 (14): 229–297. (Hemidactylus bavazzanoi, new species, pp. 249–255, Figures 13–16). (in English, with an abstract in Italian).
Largen MJ, Spawls S (2010). Amphibians and Reptiles of Ethiopea and Eritrea. Frankfurt am Main: Edition Chimaira / Serpents Tale. 694 pp. . (Hemidactylus bavazzanoi, p. 291).
Rösler H (2000). "Kommentierte Liste der rezent, subrezent und fossil bekannten Geckotaxa (Reptilia: Gekkonomorpha)". Gekkota 2: 28–153. (Hemidactylus bavazzanoi, p. 85). (in German).
Spawls S, Howell K, Hinkel H, Menegon M (2018). Field Guide to East African Reptiles, Second Edition. London: Bloomsbury Natural History. 624 pp. . (Hemidactylus bavazzanoi, p. 87).

Hemidactylus
Reptiles described in 1978